The Church of Santiago ( or Santiago el mayor) is a Roman Catholic church in the town of Sariego, in the community of Asturias, Spain. 

Originally built in the 10th century, the church has pre-Romanesque windows reminiscent of those of the Church of San Salvador de Valdediós. (Pre-Romanesque architecture in Asturias is framed between the years 711 and 910, the period of the creation and expansion of the kingdom of Asturias).
It was refurbished in the 15th or 16th centuries.

The church was burned down during the Spanish Civil war and rebuilt..

References

Santiago (Sariego)
10th-century churches in Spain
15th-century Roman Catholic church buildings in Spain
Bien de Interés Cultural landmarks in Asturias

es:Iglesia de Santiago de Sariego